Florinel Teodor Coman (born 10 April 1998) is a Romanian professional footballer who plays as a winger for Liga I club FCSB and the Romania national team.

After starting out at Viitorul Constanța and winning a national championship in his third season at the club, he signed for FCSB in August 2017. Between 2016–17 and 2019–20, Coman was named to the Liga I Team of the Season.

He made his senior debut for Romania in October 2019, after previously being capped at under-17, under-19 and under-21 levels.

Early life
Coman was born in the city of Brăila and grew up as a Dinamo București supporter.

Club career

Viitorul Constanța
Coman was selected from Viitorul Constanța's academy by first-team manager and owner Gheorghe Hagi, and made his professional debut by coming on as a substitute in a 2–0 Liga I win against Astra Giurgiu on 18 March 2015. On 14 August 2016, aged 18, he scored his first goal in a 3–1 league victory over ASA Târgu Mureș.

Coman was named the Liga I Player of the Month for February 2017, after scoring against Dinamo București, Pandurii Târgu Jiu and ACS Poli Timișoara, respectively. He was once again on the scoresheet on 18 March, opening a 3–1 home win against FCSB. On 13 May, Coman won the penalty from which Gabriel Iancu netted the only goal of the final fixture with CFR Cluj, a win that earned Viitorul its first national title.

FCSB

2017–2020: Adjustment to Bucharest and breakthrough
After Portuguese media outlets reported that Benfica had shown interest in acquiring Coman, he moved to FCSB on 21 August 2017 for a reported €2 million plus €500,000 in add-ons. His release clause was set at  a Romanian record of €100 million, with former club Viitorul Constanța also being entitled to 20% of a future transfer fee, economic rights which were bought in November for €1 million. 

Coman scored his first goals for the Roș-albaștrii on 22 October 2017, with two goals in a 7–0 thrashing of ACS Poli Timișoara.
On 2 November, he recorded his first European goal in a 1–1 draw with Hapoel Be'er Sheva in the UEFA Europa League group stage. Also in the latter competition, Coman entered the pitch after half-time in a round of 32 1–5 loss to Lazio at the Stadio Olimpico and contributed to Harlem Gnohéré's goal, on 22 February 2018. After an inconsistent start at FCSB, he cemented his place in the starting eleven in his second season in Bucharest, with twelve goals from 38 appearances in all competitions.

On 14 July 2019, in the opening fixture of the 2019–20 Liga I, he scored and provided an assist in a 4–3 victory over Hermannstadt. He then went on to score one each in the two-legged tie against Armenian club Alashkert counting for the Europa League second qualifying round, which his team won 5–3 on aggregate. FCSB failed to qualify for the group stage for a second year in a row after losing to Vitória Guimarães in the play-off round; Coman however rose to prominence individually, as he had scored ten goals and was the top scorer of the domestic league by the turn of the year. His good form earned him the fifth place in Gazeta Sporturilors 2019 Romanian Footballer of the Year award, tied with Ianis Hagi.

2020–present: Struggles with injuries

Coman spent roughly half of 2020 without playing, initially due to the COVID-19 pandemic and then after being injured in September in a match against TSC Bačka Topola in the Europa League qualifiers. He returned from the sidelines on 6 December, entering as a substitute and scoring a goal in a 3–0 win over UTA Arad; he broke down in tears and dedicated the goal to his late grandfather. Coman picked up another injury in March 2021, and one more in August that year which required surgical intervention.

On 28 July 2022, Coman netted for the first time in almost a year in a 4–2 home defeat of Saburtalo Tbilisi counting for the Europa Conference League qualifiers. In the same match, he was also handed the captain armband as a result of Florin Tănase's imminent departure. On 9 October, he doubled the lead in a 2–0 away victory over Petrolul Ploiești, representing his first Liga I goal in 22 months.

International career
Coman featured for Romania under-21 in the 2019 UEFA European Championship, mostly as a second-half substitute. In the group fixture on 21 June, he entered in the 63rd minute for Andrei Ivan, obtained a penalty and scored a double to help to a 4–2 victory against England. He then earned his first and only start in a goalless draw with France, with both teams progressing to the semi-finals, where Romania suffered a 2–4 defeat to Germany.

Coman made his full debut for Romania on 12 October 2019, starting in a Euro 2020 qualifier against the Faroe Islands. He was replaced after 69 minutes by Alexandru Mitriță in the eventual 3–0 victory of his nation.

Style of play
Coman is typically deployed as a left winger and has been praised for his pace and technical ability. He has sometimes been compared to French forward Kylian Mbappé.

Career statistics

Club

International

HonoursViitorul ConstanțaLiga I: 2016–17
Supercupa României runner-up: 2017FCSBCupa României: 2019–20
Supercupa României runner-up: 2020Individual'
Liga I Team of the Season: 2016–17, 2018–19, 2019–20

References

External links

1998 births
Living people
Sportspeople from Brăila
Romanian footballers
Association football forwards
Association football wingers
Liga I players
FC Viitorul Constanța players
FC Steaua București players
Romania youth international footballers
Romania under-21 international footballers
Romania international footballers